Roaring Timber is a 1937 American adventure film directed by Phil Rosen and starring Jack Holt.

Cast list
 Jack Holt as Jim Sherwood
 Grace Bradley as Kay MacKinley
 Ruth Donnelly as Aunt Mary
 Raymond Hatton as Tennessee
 Willard Robertson as Harrigan
 J. Farrell MacDonald as Andrew MacKinley
 Charles Wilson as Sam Garvin
 Ernest Wood as Slim Bagnell
 Philip Ahn as Ah Sing, also known as Crooner
 Fred Kohler Jr. as Curley

References

External links 
 
 
 

Films directed by Phil Rosen
1937 drama films
1937 films
American drama films
American black-and-white films
Films set in forests
Films about lumberjacks
1930s American films
1930s English-language films